Riverbank Studios is an independent film production company based in India and founded by the filmmaker and conservationist, Mike Pandey.

History 
Riverbank Studios was set up in 1973 by Mike Pandey in New Delhi and was one of the first film studios in North India at the time. Many feature films, Ad films and Television series were both shot on the premises of the studio and post produced as well. Over the years the studio has leaned towards making conservation driven wildlife films and has been committed to creating awareness generating content.

The studio produces television series, wildlife films and has recently ventured to online content, producing their first 360-degree film on a Nature Reserve in India. In 2017, they produced two films which were broadcast on Animal Planet India - Looking for Sultan and Gyamo - Queen of the Mountains. Both films received strong positive review and were aired on both Animal Planet and Discovery India.

Television 
 Ghar Ka Chirag
 Khullam Khulla - Kids TV
 Ghoomo TVC

Award Winning Films 
The Last Migration 
 Wildscreen Festival, Bristol, UK – 1994
 Spirit Of Wilderness, Santa Fe, New Mexico, USA – 1994
 Care For Nature Award, International World Wildlife Fund, Bangalore, India.
 Special Jury Award, International Video Festival (IVFest), Trivandrum – 1995
 We The People, South Africa.
Shores of Silence
 Wildscreen Festival, Bristol
 The Citta Di Toronto at the Cinemambiente Award - 2001
 The 6th Sichuan TV Festival , China - 2001
 The Honour of Knowledge Award at Bratislava, Slovakia - 2001
 The Golden Jury Award, Worldfest, Houston- 2002
 The Rolls-Royce, Commonwealth Broadcasting Award, UK- 2002
 Ecofilm, Award in the Category of Documentary, Oct 2002
 Ministry of the Environment of the Czech Republic Award, Nov 2002
 Wildlife trust of India, Endangered Species Award, 2002
 Vatavaran 2003 Prithvi Ratan Award for Outstanding Achievement in Global Conservation, November 2003
 National Award for Best Adventure & Exploration Film, 2005
Vanishing Giants
 Wildscreen Festival, Bristol
Timeless Traveller
 Vatavaran Festival
 International Wildlife Film Festival in Albert
Earth Matters
 Golden Giraffe for conservation" International Wildlife Film Festival in Albert

Filmography

References

External links 
 Riverbank Studios Website

Film production companies of India